The Fiat 70 was a car produced by Italian car manufacturer Fiat between 1915 and 1920. Around a thousand of this model were produced, with almost all going to the Italian army.
The car was quite advanced for its time, featuring a complete electrical system.

The 70 was replaced by the Fiat 501.

References 

70
Cars introduced in 1915
1920s cars